Medley is an unincorporated community on Patterson Creek in Grant County, West Virginia, United States.

The community most likely was named after the local Medley family.

References

Unincorporated communities in Grant County, West Virginia
Unincorporated communities in West Virginia